The river shiner (Notropis blennius) is a species of ray-finned fish in the genus Notropis. It is found in the United States and Canada, where it inhabits the Hudson Bay basin from Alberta to Manitoba, south through the Red Red River in Minnesota and North Dakota; and the Mississippi River basin from Wisconsin and Minnesota to Texas, Louisiana, and Mississippi, west to eastern Colorado, and east to West Virginia.

References 

 

Notropis
Fish described in 1856
Taxa named by Charles Frédéric Girard